Edward Michael Robbins (born 11 August 1955) is an English comic, actor, television presenter and radio broadcaster.
He has performed as a warm-up artist for numerous pre-recorded comedy shows that have been filmed before live studio audiences including Granada Television's Wood and Walters and Birds of a Feather, provided the voiceover in Catchphrase from 1994 to 1996 and returned in Roy Walker's penultimate series in 1998 and 1999, and the BBC's Little Britain. He also starred in Peter Kay's Phoenix Nights (2001–02) for both series as Den Perry, the main "villain", and also the Governor in The Slammer. His most recent roles were in Benidorm in 2012 as Victor St. James as well as Hank Zipzer in episode 8 playing Bob Bing The Sausage King and Diddy TV playing Larry Weinsteinberger/Bingbongberger.

He guest starred as Barry Quid in Series 10 of Birds of a Feather and also in the comedy series The League of Gentlemen as Tony Cluedo, singer of Crème Brulee.

In 2020 Robbins appeared on the rebooted version of Crackerjack! as one of the "Crackerjack Players.

Personal life
Robbins is a supporter of Rossendale RUFC, where his son, Jack, plays as a prop.

Robbins is also the President of Bleakholt Animal Sanctuary in Edenfield, Lancashire.
Robbins is the brother of actresses Kate and Amy Robbins and a first cousin once removed of Paul McCartney. His grandfather, also named Ted, served as secretary of the Football Association of Wales between 1909 and 1946.

Robbins has performed in panto at the Charter Theatre, Preston and in 2014 he performed Cinderella at the Stockport Plaza, returning to play Widow Twanky in Aladdin in 2017. He also performed in Cinderella at the Liverpool Empire in 2008.

On 31 January 2015, Robbins suffered a heart attack and collapsed on stage, clutching his chest, during his solo sketch at the opening night of the Phoenix Nights Live tour at the Manchester Arena. His health has improved since then and he has lost two stone.

Filmography

Film

Television

He also narrated the Railway Series books by Christopher Awdry for audio cassette.

References

External links

1955 births
English radio personalities
Living people
Male actors from Liverpool
People educated at Wirral Grammar School for Boys
People from Blackburn
20th-century English male actors
21st-century English male actors
English male comedians